Rebirth of the Temple is the first studio album by the American metalcore band Silent Civilian. It was released on May 2, 2006, by Mediaskare Records. The album contains two enhanced videos – one music video for the song "Rebirth of the Temple" and a behind-the-scenes look at how the album was made. In the music video, Wayne Static from Static-X and Roy Mayorga from Stone Sour can be seen on the left at the start.

Nearly a year after the album's release, a video for "The Song Remains Un-Named" was released. The video shows the possible tragic effects of alcohol and drug abuse. The edit of the song is different from the album's as not only is the song shortened heavily but, during the chorus, there is an extra lead guitar playing. The title of the song is a parody of Led Zeppelin's "The Song Remains the Same".

The band Spineshank, who Jonny Santos is also in, also recorded a song called "Dead to Me", for the album Self-Destructive Pattern.

The promotional edition of this album has a different track 11, "Blood Red Sky" (4:43).

Track listing
All songs written by Jonny Santos and Chris Mora, except where noted.

2006 debut albums
Albums produced by Logan Mader
Silent Civilian albums
Mediaskare Records albums